The 2019–20 Croatian Football Cup was the twenty-ninth season of Croatia's football knockout competition. The defending champions were Rijeka, having won their fifth title the previous year by defeating Dinamo Zagreb in the final.

Calendar

Participating clubs
The following 48 teams qualified for the competition:

Preliminary round
The draw for the preliminary single-legged round was held on 30 July 2019 and the matches were played on 28 August 2019.

* Match played on 14 August.** Match played on 27 August.

First round
The first round was played on 25 September 2019.

* Matches played on 24 September.** Match played on 1 October.

Second round
The second round was played on 30 October 2019.

* Match played on 23 October.

Quarter-finals
The quarter-finals were played on 3 and 4 December 2019.

Semi-finals
The semi-finals were played on 30 and 31 May 2020.

Final
The final was played on 1 August 2020.

Bracket

Top scorers

Notes

References

External links
Official website 
Competition rules 

Croatian Football Cup seasons
Croatia
Croatian Cup, 2019-20
Association football events postponed due to the COVID-19 pandemic